The 1986–87 Scottish Cup was the 102nd staging of Scotland's most prestigious football knockout competition. The Cup was won by St Mirren who defeated Dundee United in the final. It is also the last time the competition was won by a team containing only Scottish players.

First round

Replay

Second round

Replays

Third round

Replays

Second Replays

Fourth round

Replays

Second Replays

Quarter-finals

Replays

Semi-finals

Final

See also
1986–87 in Scottish football
1986–87 Scottish League Cup

Scottish Cup seasons
Scottish Cup, 1986-87
Scot